Patrick Gerald Elynuik (born October 30, 1967) is a Canadian former professional ice hockey player who played 506 games in the National Hockey League. After winning a Memorial Cup as a member of the Prince Albert Raiders in 1985, he was drafted in the first round of the 1986 NHL Entry Draft, 8th overall by the Winnipeg Jets. He also played his career for the Washington Capitals, Tampa Bay Lightning and Ottawa Senators. He retired in 1997.

Personal life
Elynuik had three sons, Hudson, Campbell, and Jakson, who all played hockey. Hudson was drafted by the Carolina Hurricanes in the 2016 NHL Entry Draft.

Career statistics

Regular season and playoffs

International

Awards
 WHL East First All-Star Team – 1986 & 1987

References

External links

1967 births
Fort Wayne Komets players
Ice hockey people from Saskatchewan
Living people
Kalamazoo Wings (1974–2000) players
Moncton Hawks players
National Hockey League first-round draft picks
Ottawa Senators players
Prince Albert Raiders players
Tampa Bay Lightning players
Washington Capitals players
Winnipeg Jets (1979–1996) draft picks
Winnipeg Jets (1979–1996) players
Canadian ice hockey right wingers